The N8 is a Bangladeshi National Highway between the capital Dhaka and the town of Patuakhali. It starts from the Jatrabari interchange and ends at the Patuakhali bridge.

See also
 List of roads in Bangladesh

References

AH1
National Highways in Bangladesh